BRP Boracay (FPB-2401) is the lead ship of four Boracay class Patrol Boats built by OCEA of France for the Philippine Coast Guard based on the Ocea FPB 72 design.

Construction, delivery and commissioning

Operational history
In early October 2018, BRP Boracay made its first deployment in the island it was named after, Boracay in the province of Aklan, Western Visayas.

In late October 2018, the ship made its first rescue when it along with  assisted in the transfer of passengers of the M/V Super Shuttle 18 which was stranded off the port of Malay, Aklan due to engine trouble. All of the 142 passengers of M/V Super Shuttle 18 were later safely brought to the Caticlan Jetty Port.

The drill was held in Manila Bay and featured the mock hijacking of a vessel and arrest of the perpetrators aboard the ship.

References

Ships of the Philippine Coast Guard
2018 ships
Ships built in France